The Right to Rock is the second studio album by American glam metal band Keel. It was the first to be produced by Kiss's Gene Simmons under their new label Gold Mountain Records (which was distributed by A&M Records at the time). When the band started recording the album, drummer Bobby Marks left. He was replaced by different drummers: Fred Coury (who went on to join Cinderella), Barry Brandt (of Angel) and Steve Riley (who plays on the entire album but subsequently left to join the band W.A.S.P.). Dwain Miller eventually became the band's permanent drummer right before the album was released. The band had only written three songs when the label sent them to the studio, therefore Keel covered three Gene Simmons demos and re-recorded three songs from their debut album - "Tonight You're Mine" was renamed to "You're the Victim (I'm the Crime)" for this album.

Track listing
Side one
 "The Right to Rock" (Ron Keel, Marc Ferrari, Kenny Chaisson) - 3:35
 "Back to the City" (R. Keel, Chaisson) - 3:47
 "Let's Spend the Night Together" (Mick Jagger, Keith Richards)  - 3:41
 "Easier Said than Done" (Gene Simmons, Mitch Weissman) - 3:25
 "So Many Girls, So Little Time" (Simmons, Howard Rice) - 3:15

Side two
"Electric Love" (R. Keel, Chaisson) - 4:05
 "Speed Demon" (R. Keel) - 3:39
 "Get Down" (Simmons, Rice) - 5:02
 "You're the Victim (I'm the Crime)" (R. Keel, Chaisson, Bobby Marks) - 2:59

The remastered version of the album features two bonus tracks - a remixed version of "Easier Said than Done", and a "reunion" version of "The Right to Rock".

Personnel
Band members
 Ron Keel - vocals and guitar
 Marc Ferrari - guitar and vocals
 Bryan Jay - guitar and vocals
 Kenny Chaisson - bass and vocals
Steve Riley - drums and vocals

Production
Gene Simmons - producer
Mike Davis - engineer, mixing
Paul Wertheimer, Sebastian Thoner, Bruce Smith, Eddie Delena, Craig Engel - assistant engineers
Greg Fulginti - mastering
Aaron Rapoport - photography
Chuck Beeson - art direction, design
John Taylor Dismukes - illustrations
Ron Keel - liner notes

In popular culture
The song "Speed Demon" by Keel was used in the 2002 movie, Men In Black II at the post office scene, when Agent J shows Agent K an alien inside a mail sorting machine.

References

External links
ArtistDirect Review

Keel (band) albums
1985 albums
Vertigo Records albums
King Records (Japan) albums
Albums produced by Gene Simmons